Iron(II) phosphate, also ferrous phosphate, Fe3(PO4)2, is an iron salt of phosphoric acid.

Natural occurrences 
The mineral vivianite is a naturally occurring form of hydrated iron(II) phosphate.

Production
It can be formed by the reaction of ferrous hydroxide with phosphoric acid to produce hydrated iron(II) phosphate.

See also
Iron(III) phosphate

References

External links

Phosphates
Iron(II) compounds